Altentreptow is a town in the Mecklenburgische Seenplatte district, in Mecklenburg-Western Pomerania, Germany. It is situated on the river Tollense in Western Pomerania, 15 km north of Neubrandenburg. Until 1939 the city's name was Treptow an der Tollense.

History
The origins of the town go back to a Slavic settlement that grew up around a fortress located on a small hill, where the town church lies today. The name Treptow is mentioned for the first time in 1175, in reference to the establishment of a monastery on the site, which however later moved to Verchen. The present town was most probably founded in the early 13th century, and is referred to as a "civitas", i.e. Latin for "city", in 1245. In 1282, a document confirms that the town was ruled by Lübeck law. The medieval town had three churches, of which only one survives, as well as a medieval hospital and a system of double defensive walls built before 1360. The town has suffered much destruction through fire and war during the centuries, and in 1743 the town walls were almost completely removed. Two city gates from c. 1450 still survive; the Brandenburger Torturm and the Deminner Torturm. Of the latter, only the ground floor remains, with additions and alterations made in the 19th century.

Notable people

 William Hentschel (1874–1925), local poet
 Albert Grzesinski (1879–1947), Prussian Minister of the Interior from 1926 to 1930 (SPD)
 Ilse Kaschube (born 1953), sprint canoer
 Manfred Schmidt (1929–2005), German theologian and politician (CDU)
 Christine Wachtel (born 1965), German athlete

Related to Altentreptow
 Fritz Reuter (1810–1874), poet and writer
 Sebastian Zbik (born 1982), German Boxer
 Sybille Kempf (born 1945), mayor after the turn from 1992 to 2012

References

External links 

Official website of Altentreptow (German)

Populated places established in the 13th century
1240s establishments in the Holy Roman Empire
1245 establishments in Europe